Chen Chi-lu (27 April 1923 – 6 October 2014) was a Taiwanese politician, historian and anthropologist. He was the first Minister of the Council for Cultural Affairs, taking office in 1981 and serving until 1988.

Education and early career
Chen was born on 27 April 1923 in Tainan Prefecture during the Japanese rule of Taiwan. Chen moved with his parents when he was still a child to China, then Japan, where he attended First Senior High School in Tokyo. Chen then returned to China, enrolling at St. John's University in Shanghai. He received his bachelor's degree in political science and economics in 1948. Upon graduation from Shanghai, Chen returned to Taiwan and worked for Public Opinion Daily as an editor. He obtained his master's degree at the University of New Mexico in the United States in 1954. Subsequently, Chen began teaching anthropology at National Taiwan University (NTU). He earned his doctoral degree in sociology from University of Tokyo in Japan in 1966, after which he became a professor of anthropology at NTU. Later he became an academician at the Academia Sinica.

Later career and death
While leading the Council for Cultural Affairs, Chen hosted various art exhibitions, proposed the establishment of folk and cultural parks and preserved old traditional architecture in Taiwan.

Chen died on 6 October 2014 due to multiple organ failure.

References

1923 births
2014 deaths
Taiwanese Ministers of Culture
Politicians of the Republic of China on Taiwan from Tainan
20th-century Taiwanese historians
Taiwanese anthropologists
St. John's University, Shanghai alumni
University of New Mexico alumni
University of Tokyo alumni
Academic staff of the National Taiwan University
Members of Academia Sinica